Quercus acuta, the Japanese evergreen oak, is an oak native to Japan, South Korea, Taiwan, and China's Guizhou Province and Guangdong Province. It is placed in subgenus Cerris, section Cyclobalanopsis.

Description
Due to its foliage and habitat, it looks rather unlike most other oaks. Quercus acuta is usually bushy and densely domed, reaching a height of 14 meters. The bark is smooth and dark grey. Leaves are dark and glossy above and yellowish beneath. They narrow to a long, finely-rounded tip. The flowers are on a stiff 5 cm catkin.

Heartwood is pale reddish brown to reddish brown. Sapwood is pale yellowish brown with a slightly reddish color.

Common names
In Japan, it is called akagashi (赤樫 - あかがし), but is also known by the names oogashi (大樫 - オオガシ) and oobagashi (大葉樫 - オオバガシ). 

In the Korean language, it is 붉가시.

Uses
Like shirakashi (白樫 - しらかし) (Quercus myrsinifolia), whose wood is often called shirokashi outside of Japan, and other related sub-genera, Japanese Evergreen Oak, or akagashi, is a preferred choice for Japanese martial arts practice weapons such as bokken. This is due to its uniformly tight grain structure resulting from its continuous growing season. It should not be confused with the oriental or Asian white oak, Quercus aliena.

References

acuta
Trees of Japan
Trees of Korea
Trees of China
Plants described in 1784